Jasper Jones is an  Australian mystery drama film directed by Rachel Perkins. The film was released in 2017 and is based on the 2009 novel of the same name by Craig Silvey.

Plot
Charlie Bucktin is a 14-year-old boy living in the fictitious rural town of Corrigan, based on the real rural town Corrigin in Western Australia. Charlie spends his days with his best friend Jeffrey Lu, a Vietnamese boy who shares Charlie's love of intellectual banter, and deals stoically with the constant race-hate inflicted on him and his family. Eliza Wishart, a local girl, and daughter of the mayor of the town becomes more and more endeared towards Charlie.

On Christmas evening Charlie is unexpectedly visited by Jasper Jones, an outcast in Corrigan due to his Aboriginal heritage and rebellious lifestyle. Jasper begs for Charlie's help, and leads him to his private glade in the bush. Here Charlie is horrified to find the dead body of a young girl, Jasper's girlfriend Laura Wishart, battered and hanging from a tree. Jasper, aware that he is likely to be blamed for Laura's murder, convinces Charlie that they should hide the body, so they throw it into a nearby pond, weighted by a large rock.

Jeffrey is passionate about cricket, but his attempts to join the Corrigan team are thwarted by the racism of the coach and other players. Eventually fortune goes his way, and he finds himself batting in a game against a rival town, watched by Charlie, who has befriended Eliza, Laura Wishart's younger sister. As Jeffrey wins the game on the last ball, Charlie and Eliza hold hands and embrace.

A search for the missing girl is soon organised, focused on the idea that she may have run away. Jasper is interrogated roughly by the local police, but he soon escapes. Meanwhile tension builds in the town, as parents fear more disappearances, and townspeople search for someone to blame. The tension is funneled into strict curfews for the children as well as racial attacks on Jeffrey's family. It is revealed that Charlie's mother, increasingly disillusioned with life in Corrigan and her marriage, is having an affair with the Sargeant involved with the investigation into Laura's disappearance.

Jasper believes that Laura's murderer is Mad Jack Lionel, a reclusive old man who is rumoured to have done terrible things in the past.  Jasper determines to confront Lionel on New Year's Eve, and together with Charlie, goes to his house. Lionel manages to defuse Jasper's aggression, and the truth comes out: Lionel is actually Jasper's grandfather who had ostracised his son's family knowing that he had married with an Aboriginal woman when Jasper was a baby. His daughter-in-law then took care of him, spurring a change of heart towards her. One night, she needed medical attention, and Lionel had attempted to race her to hospital. In his haste, however, he accidentally crashed his car, causing her death. The incident has left him guilty, broken, and ostracised by the townspeople. Ever since, Lionel has been trying to reach out to Jasper and apologise for his actions.

On the same night, Charlie comes to Eliza's window. They go to Jasper's glade. Here Eliza tells Charlie that she knows everything about Laura's death and hands him the suicide note detailing the gruesome reasons for her apparent suicide. The note said that after rampant sexual abuse by her abusive father, leaving Laura pregnant, and after a particularly violent fight on Christmas day, Laura came looking for Jasper. Eliza followed her to the glade. Finding Jasper away, in despair Laura hanged herself, and Eliza, paralysed by fear, could not save her. Charlie then confesses that he and Jasper had thrown Laura's body into the pond.  The next day Charlie and Eliza take the note to Eliza's mother. She quietly reads the note then tears it repeatedly, eventually soaking the tiny scraps in her cup of tea without saying a word. The look on her face makes clear that she knew about the abuse and even now has no intention of addressing it. Eliza harshly insists that Charlie leave the house.  He passes her father in the yard and then makes his way to the police station to report what he knows. His attempt is interrupted by news that the Wishart house is on fire and everyone runs to the scene.

Charlie's mother leaves Corrigan. Charlie remains close to Eliza, who exacts revenge on her father by setting fire to their house, injuring him. The secret about Laura's death remains with the three of them.

Cast
Levi Miller as Charlie Bucktin 
Angourie Rice as Eliza Wishart
Aaron L. McGrath as Jasper Jones
Toni Collette as Ruth Bucktin
Hugo Weaving as Mad Jack Lionel
Kevin Long as Jeffrey Lu
Dan Wyllie as Wes Bucktin
Matthew Nable as Sarge

Reception
On review aggregator Rotten Tomatoes, the film holds an approval rating of 77% based on 22 reviews, with an average rating of 6.75/10.

C.J. Johnson of ABC Radio gave a positive review, calling the film "engrossing, surprising and moving, and obviously made with great care and love." Sarah Ward of Playground also gave a positive review, commenting "There's always room for a smart, thoughtful and engaging take on a well-worn premise, and Bran Nue Dae director Rachel Perkins delivers just that" Alex Doenau of Trespass described the film as "well scripted, shot, and acted, there's very little not to recommend it."

Jim Schembri of 3AW gave a negative review, describing the story as "pitted with plotholes of implausibility that continually take you out of the picture, robbing the film almost entirely of tension." Jake Wilson of The Age gave a mixed review, writing "It's hard to say if there is a centre to a narrative that jumps from one subplot to another in the manner of a soap opera."

Accolades

References

External links

Official Jasper Jones movie website 
Screen Australia - Jasper Jones
Quiet on Set (Australia) - Jasper Jones
Jasper Jones on Rotten Tomatoes

2017 films
Films based on Australian novels
Films set in 1969
Films set in Western Australia
Films shot in Western Australia
Australian drama films
Films about Aboriginal Australians
Films about racism
Films about child sexual abuse
Films about suicide
Films directed by Rachel Perkins
Films produced by Liz Watts
2010s English-language films
Screen Australia films